Saumarez Smith (18361909) was a British-born Anglican Archbishop of Sydney, Australia.

Saumarez Smith may also refer to:
 Charles Saumarez Smith (born 1954), British cultural historian
 Joseph Saumarez Smith (born 1971), British entrepreneur, journalist and gambling expert

See also 
 Saumarez (disambiguation)
 J. Denis Summers-Smith